The Progressive Union for Renewal (UPR), formerly called Progressive Union, is a political party in Benin, led by Bruno Amoussou. It tends to be more popular in the south of the country.

In the 2019 Beninese parliamentary election, the party came first, winning 47 of 83 seats in the National Assembly.  Both the Progressive Union and the only other party in the National Assembly, Republican Bloc, are allied with President Patrice Talon. The current Vice President of Benin, Mariam Chabi Talata, is a member. In July 2022, Bruno Amoussou retired and left the presidency of the UP to Joseph Djogbenou. In August 2022, the party merged with the Democratic Renewal Party and changed to its present name.

Presidents

The following is a list of Presidents of the UPR:

Electoral history

Parliamentary elections

Municipal elections

References

2018 establishments in Benin
Social democratic parties in Africa
Political parties established in 2018
Political parties in Benin
Pan-Africanist political parties in Africa